This is a list of the 15 members of the European Parliament for Ireland elected at the 1984 European Parliament election. They served in the 1984 to 1989 session.

List

†Replaced during term, see table below for details.

Changes

See also
List of members of the European Parliament, 1984–1989 – List by country

External links
ElectionsIreland.org – 1984 European Parliament (Ireland) election results
European Parliament office in Ireland – Irish MEPs: 1984–89

1984-89
European Parliament
 List
Ireland